Gordius may refer to:
 Gordius (worm), a genus of horsehair worms
 Gordias, or Gordius, an ancient royal family of Phrygia
 Saint Gordius (died c. 315), a Christian soldier and martyr in Cappadocia